Gordon B. Davidson (June 24, 1926 – July 17, 2015) was a Louisville, Kentucky-based business attorney, and a member of the Louisville Sponsoring Group, the collection of business leaders who put up the money that launched Muhammad Ali into professional boxing.

Background
Davidson was a lifelong resident of Louisville, Kentucky, who was born there on June 24, 1926.  He attended Centre College in Danville, Kentucky. Davidson earned his J.D. from University of Louisville Louis D. Brandeis School of Law, as well as a LL.M. from Yale Law School in 1952. He was admitted to the Bar of the Commonwealth of Kentucky in 1951.

Career
From 1954 to 1955, Davidson was a law clerk to U.S. Supreme Court Justice Stanley Forman Reed. He and other clerks did research on the Brown vs. Board of Education desegregation litigation.

In 1960, Davidson was part of the Louisville Sponsoring Group, who was responsible for signing Muhammad Ali to boxing.  The contract was signed on October 26, 1960, and Ali's first professional fight took place three days later, on October 29, 1960.

Mr. Davidson served as managing partner at Wyatt, Tarrant & Combs from 1980 to 1995.

Community activities
Davidson served on the board of important companies, including The Courier-Journal and BellSouth.  He held leadership positions on the boards of a civic, charitable and educational institutions: Greater Louisville Inc., Louisville Central Area, Kentucky Derby Festival, and the Louisville Development Committee.
After numerous years of leadership for the Kentucky Center for the Arts,
he was a Director Emeritus for the organization.

In 1973, he was named as an Outstanding Louisville Alumni for Centre College for his devotion to the school and his distinguished career.

In 1989, the Louisville Area Chamber of Commerce bestowed on Davidson its top civic-service award, the Gold Cup, for his leadership at a number of major arts and civic organizations in the region.

See also 
 List of law clerks of the Supreme Court of the United States (Seat 6)

References

1926 births
2015 deaths
Centre College alumni
Kentucky lawyers
20th-century American lawyers
Law clerks of the Supreme Court of the United States
Lawyers from Louisville, Kentucky
University of Louisville School of Law alumni
Yale Law School alumni